Zulema de la Cruz Castillejo (born 9 March 1958) is a Spanish pianist and composer.

Life
Zulema de la Cruz was born in Madrid and studied at the Madrid Conservatory for piano and composition and Stanford University in California for composition and computer music, with professors including Carmelo Bernaola and Ramón Barce. She continued her studies at the Center for Computer Research in Music and Acoustics at Stanford University with J. Chowning.

After completing her studies, she took a position as professor in Electroacoustic Composition at the Madrid Conservatory in 1988. She has also taught at the Cuenca Conservatory, the Carlos III University of Madrid, and others. She was instrumental in establishing and has served as director of the Research Laboratory for Computer and Electroacoustic Composition (LICEO) at the Madrid Conservatory.

De la Cruz has performed with Sax Ensemble since 1993, and also with Fundación Sax. She has also served as director of music festivals and on boards and advisory committees, including Consejo Nacional de La Música of the Spanish Ministry of Education and Culture. Her works have been performed internationally.

Honors and awards
Ruiz Morales competition
Arpa de Oro competition
Golden Harp competition VII
Luis Coleman competition
George Maile (USA) competition
Ciatat D'Alcoy prize
Premio Nacional de Música award, 1997
Fourth Edition Music Award
Best Classical Music Author from SGAE and Performers Association (IEA)

Works
De la Cruz composes chamber, symphonic and electroacoustic music, both alone and in combination with classical instruments. Selected works include:

Kinesis-2 for string quartet
Concierto no. 1, Atlantico for piano and orchestra
Danzas Galegas (Galician Dances) for viola solo (2003)
La Luz del Aire for chamber ensemble
Latir Isle for piano
pulsars for piano and tape
Soledad for string orchestra
Evocación
Latir Isleño for piano
Nucleofonias
Lorca Quintet for string quartet and solo guitar

Her works have been recorded and issued on media, including:
Zulema de la Cruz Audio CD (March 29, 2005) Col Legno
Solo Rumores Audio CD
Weber & Rossini: Works for clarinet & piano Audio CD, Columno

References

1958 births
Living people
20th-century classical composers
Spanish music educators
Spanish women classical composers
Spanish classical composers
21st-century classical composers
20th-century pianists
21st-century pianists
Musicians from Madrid
20th-century Spanish musicians
Women music educators
20th-century women composers
21st-century women composers
20th-century women pianists
21st-century women pianists